The Caribbean Public Health Agency (CARPHA) is a regional public health agency headquartered in Trinidad and Tobago which was established by CARICOM leaders in July 2011 and began operation in 2013.

CARPHA combines the functions of five pre-existing regional health institutions:The Caribbean Environmental Health Institute (CEHI), The Caribbean Epidemiology Centre (CAREC), The Caribbean Food and Nutrition Institute (CFNI), The Caribbean Health Research Centre (CHRC), and The Caribbean Research and Drug Treatment Laboratory (CRDTL).

History
The CARPHA was established in 2013.

On 14 May 2014, the CARPHA acknowledged the gift by the Government of Canada of a Biosafety level 3 laboratory.

Role

CARPHA aims to address regional issues including:
 Responding to disasters like hurricanes, earthquakes, and flooding.
 Monitoring and managing both communicable diseases (e.g. HIV/AIDS and COVID-19) and non communicable diseases (e.g. obesity and diabetes) that are prevalent in the region.
 Monitoring and preventing injuries, violence and illnesses in work places.
 Contributing to global health agreements and compliance with international health regulations.

COVID-19
During the COVID-19 pandemic CARPHA has been performing tests for 18 countries in the region but warned on 5 April 2020, that they were running short on reagents required for COVID-19 testing and expected to be able to continue testing for three weeks.

On 11 April 2020, Prime Minister Mia Mottley of Barbados who is the CARICOM Chair, called a special Heads of Government meeting to deal with the COVID-19 pandemic, and establish a common public health protocol, and border policy. The governments have agreed to the proposal in a virtual meeting.

Membership 

CARPHA has 26 full members throughout the Americas.

See also
For similar agencies, please see the List of national public health agencies
 PAHO
 World Health Organization (WHO)

References

External links
 

Public health organizations
Institutions of the Caribbean Community
Medical and health organisations based in Trinidad and Tobago
Organizations established in 2011
2011 establishments in North America
2010s establishments in the Caribbean
Biosafety level 3 laboratories